Leslie David Gottlieb (1936–2012) was a United States biologist described by the Botanical Society of America as "one of the most influential plant evolutionary biologists over the past several decades". He was employed at the University of California, Davis for 34 years, and published widely. In addition to his primary work in plant genetics, Gottlieb was an advocate for rare and endangered plant conservation.

Education
Following a Bachelor of Arts degree in English from Cornell University in 1957, Gottlieb's career began at Oregon State University in the Botany and Plant Pathology Department. He earned a master's degree in December 1965 with major professor Dr. Kenton Chambers and wrote a thesis on hybridization between species of manzanita (Arctostaphylos) trees in southwestern Oregon.  His PhD at the University of Michigan 1969 examined patterns of diversity and mechanisms of speciation in Stephanomeria. He was a faculty member of the Department of Genetics at the University of California, Davis from 1970 until 2004.

Research

Gottlieb researched a broad array of subjects including plant systematics, plant speciation (Quantum Speciation), polyploidy, gene duplication, biochemical evolution of isozymes and molecular genetics, and published more than 120 research papers and received a number of awards including a John Simon Guggenheim Fellowship (1975) and Fellowship of the American Association for the Advancement of Science (1985). In 1993 he was named Alumni Association Fellow of Oregon State University. In 1965 he earned his master's degree and wrote a thesis on hybridization between species of manzanita in southwestern Oregon.

Quantum speciation

Gottlieb was occupied with new species formation via "quantum speciation" throughout his career.   As defined by Verne Grant, and cited by Gottlieb in his 2003 summary of the subject in plants "we can define quantum speciation as the budding off of a new and very different daughter species from a semi-isolated peripheral population of the ancestral species in a cross-fertilizing organism...as compared with geographical speciation, which is a gradual and conservative process, quantum speciation is rapid and radical in its phenotypic or genotypic effects or both." Grant thought that it would be accompanied by inbreeding in the founder population.  Therefore, "quantum speciation" would be related to, if not identical with, in Gottlieb's use of the term, sympatric speciation.  In fact Gottlieb's first publication on "sympatric speciation" in Stephanomeria', published in 1971, was summarised by him in the above 2003 paper on "quantum speciation."  Gottlieb did not believe that sympatric speciation required disruptive selection to form a reproductive isolating barrier, as defined by Grant, and in fact Gottlieb stated that requiring disruptive selection was "unnecessarily restrictive" in identifying cases of sympatric speciation.

In terminology used by Gottlieb, "progenitor species " would be the parental or "ancestral" species and the newly formed daughter species was "derived."

In his first study of progenitor-derivative pairs of species, Gottlieb examined the diploid, geographically limited, self-pollinating derived species Stephanomeria malheurensis with the  diploid, geographically widespread obligate outcrossing ancestral species Stephanomeria exicua ssp. coronaria. In this case the reproductive isolating barrier was probably a change from outcrossing to selfing, and was maintained by this and a high degree of inter-specific sterility with ssp. coronaria as a result of chromosomal structural differences.  Using what was then the most modern molecular technique, starch gel electrophoresis, to determine the genetics of populations Gottlieb found that S. malheurensis had a subset of the genetic variability of ssp. coronaria. This, as well as its geographical close proximity, led Gottlieb to propose that S. malhurensis was a product of "quantum speciation." Additionally, S. malheurensis was found to be much less adapted to the local habitat than ssp. coronaria (hence the name malhurensis, which in French, "Malheur" means unhappiness or misfortune), indicating that it was probably not formed by disruptive selection.

In his second study of progenitor-derivative pairs of species, Gottlieb looked at the putative progenitor diploid Clarkia rubicunda and its hypothesized derivative, diploid C. franciscana. In 1958, Lews and Raven hypothesized that C. franciscana, which was highly self-pollinating and geographically limited, was derived from the outcrossing and more widespread C. rubicunda by large chromosomal structural rearrangements.  Lewis and Raven hypothesized that C. franciscana had rapidly speciated from C. rubicunda by a mechanism Harlan Lewis called "catastrophic selection." As with Stephanomeria, Gottlieb hypothesized that if C. franciscana was a derived species by "rapid speciation," then the derived species should have a genetic compliment that is similar to its progenitor, "i.e., possess few novel alleles." In fact, Gottlieb found that C. franciscana was genetically distinct from C. rubicunda; it did not, as expected, have a subset of the genes found in C. rubicunda. A subsequent analysis published in 1992 on another population of C. franciscana, unknown to Gottlieb 20 years earlier, led to similar conclusions.  Importantly Gottlieb ended his 1973 study of C. franciscana by stating: "To strengthen phylogenetic analyses of rapid speciation, the criterion is proposed that a species accepted as having had a rapid and recent origin by chromosomal reorganization be substantially similar to its progenitor upon electrophoretic examination." In this context Gottlieb equated "electrophoretic examination" with genetic examination by the use of isozymes. And, using this criterion, Gottlieb was not able to conclude that C. franciscana was derived from its putative progenitor C. rubicunda, as hypothesized by Lewis and Raven in 1958.

The next progenitor-derived pair of species Gottlieb examined were diploid Clarkia biloba and diploid Clarkia lingulata. C. biloba is geographically widespread, while C. lingulata is known from only two populations on the southern periphery of C. biloba; both are highly outcrossing, and there is no evidence that C. lingulata is better adapted to its habitat than C. biloba. They differ from each other by chromosomal structural differences, and hybrids between them are sterile. Lewis and Roberts proposed in 1956 that C. lingulata arose from C. biloba rapidly and in close proximity; in 1962, Lewis coined the term "catastrophic selection" to define its mode of origin. Gottlieb using starch gel electrophoresis, determined that indeed C. lingulata had a high degree of genetic similarity to C. biloba, with fewer alleles and reduced heterozygosity. Subsequent studies confirmed a sister species relationship using chloroplast DNA as well as nucleotide sequences of the gene phosphoglucose isomerase.  Gottlieb stated that this species pair, too, arose from quantum speciation.

Similar work was done with species pairs in the genus Layia. Here, the widespread progenitor was the diploid L. glandulosa, while the more restricted was the diploid L. discoidea.  Both are obligate outcrossers, though the former has ray flowers while the latter only has disc flowers.  Further, both are completely interfertile, while L. discoidea is restricted to serpentine habitats. As with the former species pairs, Gottlieb applied the electrophoretic test to these species and found that they had a very high genetic identity for the isozymes studied. Therefore, the Gottlieb and Ford concluded that these two species were related as progenitor and derivative.  Gottlieb proposed that L. discoidea arose relatively recently from adaptation to serpentine soils, also as an example of quantum speciation.

In his 2003 review, Gottlieb  summarized: The general lesson from the review of these studies is that quantum speciation remains an important and useful concept that can be applied to a greater variety of situations than initially envisaged. The genetic and chromosomal changes need not be as radical as once supposed, and a new species may originate and persist even without novel adaptations.

Another species pair that Gottlieb studied involved Gaura longiflora and G. demareei; both species are annuals, diploids, highly inter-fertile and obligate outcrossers. In this study Gottlieb demonstrated that G. demareei was genetically highly similar to Gaura longiflora. Although he did not use the words "quantum speciation" in this study, Gottlieb concluded that these species pairs represented, as with Clarkia and Stephanomeria above, that "speciation in annual plants that are obligately outcrossing can occur with minimal genetic differentiation and accords with previous results for self-pollinating species." And further, that "speciation in annual plants appears not to be consistent with the orthodox views of the process (e.g., Mayr, 1963), which propose that organisms acquire reproductive isolation as an important by-product of adapting to habitats different from that of the parental ones, that this process marks a substantial genetic reconstitution, and that it occurs gradually over long periods of time."

Polyploidy

Another subject that intrigued Gottlieb throughout his career was that of polyploidy.  In a commemorative 2014 review, Soltis et al. refer to Gottlieb and Roose's 1976 paper on Tragopogon as a "classic" in the field. In Soltis et al.'s words: "This classic paper addressed the link between genotype and biochemical phenotype and documented enzyme additivity in allopolyploids. Perhaps more important than their model of additivity, however, was their demonstration of novelty at the biochemical level. Enzyme multiplicity—the production of novel enzyme forms in the allopolyploids—can provide an extensive array of polymorphism for a polyploid individual and may explain, for example, the expanded ranges of polyploids relative to their diploid progenitors."

Although Gottlieb was not the first to hypothesize that enzyme multiplicity from dimeric isozymes could benefit the adaptedness of polyploids, his work on glutamate oxaloacetate transaminase in 1973 on the allotetraploid Stephanomeria elata was amongst the earliest as well as the first in a wild plant.  Their classic 1976 paper also demonstrated the utility of isozymes in sorting out a complicated systematics in  Tragopogon, the presence of fixed heterozygosity in its polyploids, as well as the occurrence of novel isozymes (multimers) in the Tragopogon allopolyploids.

Gottlieb's further studies on polyploidy were concerned with the fates of those genes that were duplicated by an allopolyploidization event. That is, he was interested to know if the homeologus genomes of allopolyploids were changed by being in the same nucleus—were there novel patterns of gene expression that may influence fitness; or, to quote Gottlieb in 1999 do "...polyploid species evolve differently than their diploid parents".  To sort this out, Gottlieb maintained that one had to know if any differences one saw in the allopolyploid were indeed differences from polyploidization or were they a "legacy" of the diploid progenitors.

In 1980, Roose and Gottlieb showed that in the recent (less than 100 years old) allotetraploid Tragopogon miscellus, the genes for alcohol dehydrogenase reflected their expression in the diploid parents—there was no gene silencing, changes in tissue expression, or other effect on the catalytic properties of the enzyme.  In 1999, Ford and Gottlieb found that the tetraploid Clarkia gracilis expressed the same genes for cytosolic phosphoglucose isomerase as the diploid parents; in this case gene silencing was identified in C. gracilis but they concluded that it probably occurred in one of the diploid parents, which was extinct.  This was not the case when Gottlieb and Ford looked at the recent allotetraploids Clarkia delicata and C. similis. In C. similis a gene producing phosphoglucose isomerase (called PgiC2) was silenced after the polyploidization event, while in C. delicata it was polymorphic for a normal gene and a silenced gene.  As the authors concluded PgiC2 in C. delicata "presents an example of a natural experiment in progress because the defective allele may yet be fixed or lost from the species." Further, Ford and Gottlieb postulated that silenced genes in polyploid plants could be repositories of silenced genes for "plant breeding, for example, to alter metabolism or development of cultivated relatives."

Gene duplication

Although Gottlieb did much pioneering work on gene duplication in polyploids, he also pioneered studying gene duplication in diploids. He conducted  many studies on various genes in several species, summarizing his work up to 1982 in Clarkia and Stephanomeria with duplicated genes producing  phosphoglucose isomerase (PGI), alcohol dehydrogenase (ADH), and triosephosphate isomerase (TPI). In that review, he reported that PGI in Clarkia was produced in both the cytosol and plastids by one or two nuclear genes controlling the cytosolic PGI and one nuclear gene controlling the plastid PGI. The cytosolic genes received the majority of his attention, which were found to be either single or duplicated. Further, the duplicated genes were hypothesized to have arisen by translocations rather than by un-equal crossing over.  Gottlieb applied gene duplications in determining the phylogeny of "Clarkia", because "Duplications originating by chromosomal rearrangements have a high probability of being unique.   Thus species with the PGI duplication presumably descended from a single references ancestor and can now be grouped into a monophyletic assemblage..." He conducted biochemical studies of the cytosolic PGIs in Clarkia xantiana, and found that there was very little difference in PGI's produced by the duplicated genes. In this same review he reported on a "family" of duplicated genes in Stephanomeria exigua that controlled the production of ADH. Here Roose and Gottlieb found that several tightly linked genes were inherited as one unit, and that populations could be polymorphic for duplicated and non-duplicated  genes. He reported in Stephanomeria exigua that TPI was produced by two nuclear genes that assorted independently, and that hybrid enzymes between the two loci were not found. In Clarkia species both cytosolic and plastid TPI are produced by duplicated genes, and that both loci have genetic variability.

Post 1982 Gottlieb continued to work on other enzyme systems produced by duplicated loci in different species.  In Clarkia he reported that duplicated genes for 6-phosphogluconate dehydrogenase (6-PGD) occurred throughout the genus for both cytosolic and plastid 6-PGD. In homosporus ferns he found a duplicated gene for TPI, resulting in the only case of heterozygosity resulting from gene duplication in ferns—counter to previous theory. In Layia Gottlieb  found that isocitrate dehydrognease (IDH) isozymes had one gene controlling plastid IDH and 2-3 duplicated genes controlling cytosolic IDH. In this same study with Layia he found that phosphoglucomutase (PGM) also had one gene controlling plastid PGM, and duplicated cytosolic genes. He also examined six additional genera in the Madieae, and, with Layia representing 7 of the 10 genera in this tribe of the Asteraceae. Since he found that the duplicated cytosolic PGM were found in all the genera, he postulated that the duplication may have been present at the formation of this tribe, and hypothesized that examining PGM in other tribes may help understand phylogenic relationships in the Asteraceae. Further, he asserted that the discovery of duplicated genes in the tribe Madinae, along with the work of others, supported the view that duplicated genes in flowering plants was widespread. Additionally, since all such duplicated genes were unlinked, he favored the view that duplications were the result of overlapping reciprocal translocations rather than by unequal crossing-over. Gottlieb also applied PGM isozymes to species in the genus Clarkia, and found that some species had duplicated plastid PGM, others had duplicated cytosolic PGM, and that their phylogenetic distribution was consistent with earlier work on PGI.

By far the majority of Gottlieb's gene duplication work was done with PGI in Clarkia, though he also compared the PGI from the bacteria Escherichia coli with Clarkia, showing that the nuclear encoded chloroplast (plastid) isozyme of  PGI  from Clarkia xantiana when compared to Escherichia coli shared 87.6% of its amino acid sequences. They also predicted that the cytosolic PGI's in higher plants would be considerably different than the plastid PGI's, given the hypothesized prokaryotic origin of plastid DNA, though would be more similar to eucaryotes. In 1996 Gottlieb and Ford reported that the cytosolic duplicated genes PGI1 and PGI2 were ancestral to all Clarkia, but that some species had a silenced PGI2, and that the PGI2 had been silenced at least four times independently. Gottlieb's second to last paper studied PGI duplications in other genera of the Onagraceae. From this work Gottlieb and Ford found that their PGI results supported work based on chloroplast genes and nuclear ITS sequences, and that cytosolic PGI genes showed a greater rate of divergence than that based on chloroplast genes, and therefore supplied more information. Further, they found that the PGI gene duplications of PGI1 and PGI2 occurred well before the "radiation of extant species" of Clarkia.

Plant systematics and molecular techniques

Gottlieb's first published scientific paper in 1968 was based on his M.S. Thesis, and concerned itself with the taxonomy of Arctostaphylos viscida and A. canescens. In this he was concerned with hybrids between the two and the taxonomic status of their hybrids, concluding that such hybrids were not eligible for taxonomic status as a previous investigator reported. His next publication in 1971 was based on his Ph.D. thesis, and was concerned with phylogenetic relationships in Stephanomeria. This followed in 1972 with a taxonomy of Stephanomeria. During these early years he developed an interest in isozymes, and he published a 1971 paper discussing their use in evolutionary studies. Using this new technique he applied isozymes to a taxonomic problem in Stephanomeria, and was able to demonstrate the origin of Stephanomeria malheurensis by quantum speciation (see above).  He continued to apply isozymes to other taxa, and clarified species relationships in other genera such as Clarkia, Layia, Gaura, and Tragopogon, largely relying on gene duplication and silencing results (discussed above).

From 1971 onward Gottlieb used all traditional cytogenetic, ecological, morphological, and molecular techniques as they became available to solve systematics problems, primarily within Clarkia and the Onagraceae as well as Stephanomeria and the Cichorieae.   Isozymes were used during most of his career.  It wasn't until 1986 that he applied a newer molecular technique: chloroplast DNA variation using Restriction fragment length polymorphism in determining the origin of Heterogaura from Clarkia, as well as clarifying species relationships in Clarkia.  In these two papers Gottlieb and Systma confirmed previous phylogenic results found with earlier isozyme work, as well as exposing limitations of earlier phylogenetic models that only used morphology and reproductive isolation.  Post 1986 he continued working with others using gene duplication of PGM in Clarkia and IDH in Layia (references above), including flavonoids in Stephanomeria. In this latter work he showed that the two progenitor-derivative species S. exigua ssp. coronaria and S. malheurensis were also nearly identical, concordant with earlier genetic studies.  He continued work on the phylogeny of Clarkia, using restriction site mapping of chloroplast DNA and then in 1996 Ford and Gottlieb using  nucleotide sequencing of the duplicated PGI genes further clarified Sections within Clarkia.  In 2002 he used an analysis of 18S-26S nuclear rDNA and its ITS and ETS sequences to further examine the phylogeny of Stephanomeria; in this he concluded that the annuals probably evolved more recently than the perennials, and further confirmed the progenitor-derived status of S. malheurensis. In 2006 he and others examined sequences of PgiC in Stephanomeria, and showed that it had more resolution for determining species differences than the earlier ITS/ETS results.  In 2003 using 18S-26S nuclear rDNA ITS and ETS sequences he expanded his examination of the phylogeny of Stephanomeria  to include all 24 North American genera within the tribe Cichorieae, and produced the first modern comprehensive phylogeny of the group. This work gave him the background for his contributions to the 2006 Flora of North America as well as his contributions to The Jepson Manual in 2012, his last publication.

Gottlieb was involved with the description of several new species and subspecies, including new species Stephanomeria malheurensis, new species S. fluminea, a subspecies of Clarkia concinna, and a subspecies of Clarkia mildrediae.

Morphological evolution in plants

In 1984 Gottlieb summarized a large body of literature regarding the genetic control of plant morphology. He was motivated because of "recent controversies about macroevolution." That is, a central tenet of neo-darwinian evolution is that evolution occurs by the accumulation of small genetic changes over time as opposed to the involvement of fewer genes with larger effects.   In his review he concluded that Many differences, particularly those of presence versus absence, and those of changed structure, shape, or architectural orientation are frequently governed by one or two genes; discrete phenotypic alternatives are common. This paper resulted in a rebuttal by Coyne and Lande in 1985, which was countered by Gottlieb in 1985.  Gottlieb concluded his rebuttal by statingI agree with Coyne and Lande...that "counting gene differences and measuring their effects form in themselves important tests of neo-Darwinism," but I find that it is frequently not apparent which genes should be counted, and that the proposed test cannot be convincing in the absence of developmental evidence that identifies the ontogenetic and anatomical details of character divergence.  In 1986 Gottlieb reviewed the literature in crop plants and reiterated his assertion that plant architecture was controlled by only a few genes.

A series of subsequent studies in wild plants by Gottlieb bolstered his assertions that important evolutionary changes need not involve many small genes.  In 1988 Gottlieb and Ford reported on floral pigmentation in Clarkia gracilis and discovered a basal spot allele that was unique and normally was unexpressed. They concluded: "It is an interesting speculation that many loci include alleles that normally remain unexpressed. Segregation following hybridization, frequent in plants, may place such alleles, as well as normally expressed alleles, under new patterns of regulation resulting in the abrupt appearance of novel forms." In 1989 Gottlieb concluded that floral spot patterns in Clarkia were controlled by only a few genes, and that "The flower is a complex structure in which many specialized tissues and cell types form distinctive organs in a precise and orderly manner.  The differentiation of structures is most likely independent of pigmentation pattern, and this is one reason the patterns may be changed by a few genes. Although the patterns may have a simple and readily modified developmental basis, pigment patterns are likely to have complex effects on pollination and eventual seed set." Ford and Gottlieb performed an extensive analysis of the genetic control of flower differences between the two closely related species Layia glandulosa and L. discoidea, related as progenitor and derivative, respectively. The two species differ primarily by presence versus absence of ray florets. They confirmed earlier results that the primary difference in ray flowers was due to a single gene. However, they also found a novel floret called "gibbous," and demonstrated that there were numerous gene differences between the species that affected the ray florets size, shape, and color. They concluded: Characterization of evolutionary morphological changes as major or minor is illusory unless founded on genetic analysis: the demonstration that the absence of ray florets in L. discoidea is conferred by a simple genetic difference shows that this was not a large change despite the accretion of a considerable number of differences between the species. The discovery of gibbous fiorets has particular interest because it demonstrates that novel combinations of developmental processes can be readily assimilated without evident adverse effects. The complex admixture of genes with large and small, qualitative and quantitative, effects may prove typical as more instances of morphological evolution are subjected to intensive genetic analysis.

In his last paper discussing the impact of simple genetic changes having large effects on plant morphology, Ford and Gottlieb in 1992 described a naturally occurring recessive gene that converts the petals of Clarkia concinna to sepals, making an eight sepaled plant with no petals. They concluded: The absence of deleterious pleiotropy or fitness-reducing epistatic interactions in bicalyx suggests that mutations with extensive morphological consequences can be successfully accommodated by plant developmental systems.  If such mutants were to become associated with chromosomal rearrangements reducing the fertility of hybrids between them and their progenitors, a process that has occurred repeatedly in Clarkia, the new population would probably be accorded species status.  Although the frequency of establishment of such mutations is unknown, bicalyx demonstrates that the kind of regulatory mutations being studied by plant developmental biologists may contribute to morphological diversification in nature.

Gottlieb also examined the genetic effects of single gene mutations by examining the protein expressions in the historically important Round v. Wrinkled isogenic pea genes examined by Gregor Mendel. Being isogenic, these lines only differed at the r-gene locus; however, Gottlieb found that approximately 10% of the proteins were different between these two lines, indicating that these single gene mutations had many pleiotropic effects.  Another study in peas involving genes controlling leaves, tendrils, and stipules did not find evidence of pleiotropy.

Plant conservation

Given that some of the species Gottlieb worked with were restricted to very small populations, such as Clarkia lingulata, Clarkia franciscana, and Stephanomeria malheurensis, it is not surprising that he became an advocate for rare and endangered plant conservation.  His impact is perhaps best seen by his work on S. malheurensis, which he discovered, and for which S. malheurensis  received Federal protection in 1974.  Gottlieb was involved in its protection and as well as re-establishment when it became threatened by cheatgrass in Oregon.

Literary work

In 1975 Gottlieb wrote a comparison of the two ways Charles Darwin, as a scientist, and Herman Melville, as an artist,  viewed the Galapagos Islands. According to Gottlieb, Darwin saw the Galápagos Islands as a "laboratory where he was able to examine closely process of evolution and the origin of species," while Melville "used them to derive a set of symbols to express his perception of the human condition." Gottlieb concluded that the Galápagos of Darwin and Melville "have different uses and appeal to different sensibilities."

Later life and death
During 2011, Gottlieb received treatment for pancreatic cancer and had a good period of recovery until the end of the year. Early in 2012 the cancer had returned and following complications associated with the disease, Gottlieb died on January 31, 2012.

Legacy
Gottlieb has been described as "one of the most influential plant evolutionary biologists over the past several decades." Leslie Gottlieb was honored at a Colloquium in 2013 which updated and extended many of his research areas, as well as by a 2014 theme issue of Philosophical Transactions of the Royal Society B.

Crawford et al. state "Leslie Gottlieb was interested in floral development before the age of genomics and the evolution of development (evo-devo)..." Hileman states that the genetic changes studied in the model plant Antirrhinum majus were identified by Gottlieb as being of the type that "may provide genetic information about floral traits that distinguish species or genera." Consequently, the development of modern evolutionary thought that now incorporates evo-devo was clearly anticipated by Gottlieb.

The Leslie and Vera Gottlieb Research Fund in Plant Evolutionary Biology was established in 2006 to provide funds to graduate students to support both laboratory and field research in the evolutionary biology of plants native to western North America. This is a broad field that includes evolutionary and population genetics, systematics and phylogenetic studies, comparative analyses of development, and physiological and biochemical studies of plant adaptations. The Research Fund will provide an annual award of $5000.

References

Sources

1936 births
2012 deaths
Evolutionary biologists
Cornell University alumni
Oregon State University alumni
University of Michigan alumni
University of California, Davis faculty